De Museumfabriek (formerly Jannink Museum of Textiles and Social Life and TwentseWelle) is a museum in Enschede, Netherlands. The new museum is located partly in a renovated Jannink textile factory, in reference to Enschede's textile history, and partly in an adjourning new building designed by the Amsterdam-based firm SeARCH. The project architect was Bjarne Mastenbroek. It is an Anchor point on the European Route of Industrial Heritage.

History 

Munsterland, the area of land that straddles the German-Dutch border, was known for cotton. The soil was not fertile and from the 16th century additional income was gained from flax production to make linen, which was woven into a rough sail cloth. By the 19th century, Bocholt was producing fustian (tree silk), a compound cloth of linen warp and cotton weft. This was exported. The textile merchants then established cotton mills that exploited these skills and trade links.

Egbert Jannink set up his factory on another site in 1810. It expanded and moved to this site in the Roombeek neighbourhood, next to the stream in 1900. The fireproof mill was designed and built by Sidney Stott. There were 70 fireproof textile mills constructed in Twente between 1880 and 1914. Stott, the Oldham architect, not to be confused with his cousins Stott and Sons, was a millwright who cooperated with most advanced textile machine manufacturers: the mill was handed over complete with power source, line shafting and all the spinning machines needed to spin cotton. The building was modelled on similar double-mills in Lancashire. A central tower housed the engine and the water tank for the sprinklers; to either side were the three-storey mills with the large uninterrupted floors needed for mule spinning. The height of the chimney was determined by up-draught needed by the boilers. The factory operated until 1967. It is a Rijksmonument (listed building). The building was refurbished from 1975.  The Jannink museum moved onto the ground floor in 1980; other floors were converted into housing.

The 1900 build was laid out with 16 self-acting mules and 48 Asa Lees & Co ring frames giving a total of 30,000 spindles. There were 568 power looms. In 1908 Stott returned and added the water tower and the sprinkler system; outside England it was tradition to build the name of the mill into the chimney rather than the water tower.

The Enschede fireworks disaster of 2000 devastated Roombeek. In its aftermath, three collections were combined in Roombeek.

Collections 
 Jannink Museum focuses on life and work in Twente. The textile sector dominated the lives of the poor for over 200 years. The museum shows the lives of the linen handloom weavers working from home, and all the stages of industrial life thereafter.
 The Natuurmuseum Enschede is a natural history collection.
 Van Deinse Instituut is involved in researching the past and present of Twente. It is located in Enschede and studies the regional culture, folklore, language, cultural history and landscape of Twente. It also collects, maintains, studies and displays an extensive collection of material from the history of Twente, with a full-size historic Twents Lös Hoes (open house, a farm house without separate rooms, where both livestock and humans lived together) as one of its main attractions.

References
Notes

Footnotes

Bibliography

External links

Twentsewelle  Website

Twente
Industry museums in the Netherlands
Textile museums in the Netherlands
European Route of Industrial Heritage Anchor Points